Chariton Township is a township in Chariton County, in the U.S. state of Missouri.

Chariton Township was established in 1840, taking its name from the Chariton River.

References

Townships in Missouri
Townships in Chariton County, Missouri